Georgian Constantin Tobă (born 23 May 1989) is a Romanian football player.

References

External links

1989 births
Living people
Romanian footballers
Association football midfielders
FC Drobeta-Turnu Severin players
FC Universitatea Cluj players
FC Delta Dobrogea Tulcea players
CS Minerul Motru players
Safa SC players
Liga I players
Liga II players
Expatriate footballers in Lebanon
Romanian expatriate sportspeople in Lebanon
Lebanese Premier League players
People from Drobeta-Turnu Severin